An American veterinary surgeon, co-Inventor/developer of KYON Total Elbow Replacement and one of the first to implement Specialty Veterinary Hospitals in Southern California. He received his Doctorate of Veterinary Medicine from the University of Florida in 1982. Immediately upon receiving his doctorate, he continued onto a one-year internship and three-year residency at the Ohio State University. In 1989 he received board certification and is now recognized as a Diplomate of the American College of Veterinary Surgeons. He founded the Animal Specialty Group in 1990, and has proceeded to establish ASG as one of the leading veterinary specialty hospitals in the country.

Innovations

Total Elbow Replacement
	One of the most notable developments by Dr. Wendelburg in recent has been the invention of a prosthesis for canine total elbow replacement. This revolutionary prosthesis surgically treats elbow dysplasia in canines and was developed with the help of Kyon, a leading Swiss veterinary surgical product company . While many surgical procedures, including, but not limited to, arthroscopic techniques do not allow for a full recovery and may only lead to short-term results. Dr. Wendelburg's prosthesis is the "first and only to allow for a Biomechanically Anatomical, Nonconstrained, Compartmental (BANC) Elbow Arthroplasty" The prosthesis also allows the surgeon to make an intraoperative decision as to whether a partial or full replacement is necessary, which is due primarily to its modular design. It allows for a full recovery by allowing for normal movement by eliminating mechanical links that might cause unnecessary stress. 
Along with the prosthesis, a repeatable and precise implantation method was created by Dr. Wendelburg. This procedure included the invention of different tools, including, but not limited to, a tool for identifying arc rotation within individual patients to allow for stress-free function of the joint.

Scientific Publications
• Disease Mechanisms in Small Animals Surgery Second edition

• 42. Wendelburg K. et al.: Stress fractures of the acetabulum in 26 racing greyhounds Vet Surg 17:128, 1988
• Wendelburg K, (1993), Masticatory Muscle Myositis. In, Bojrab MJ,

Memberships
 American College of Veterinary Surgeons (ACVS)
 Veterinary Orthopedic Society (VOS)
 American Veterinary Medical Association (AVMA)
 Southern California Veterinary Medical Association (SCVMA)

External links
 Animal Specialty Group
 Patellar Luxation Article

References

Year of birth missing (living people)
Living people
American veterinarians
Male veterinarians